"Ocean Breathes Salty" is a song by American rock band Modest Mouse, released on August 23, 2004 as the second single from their fourth studio album Good News for People Who Love Bad News.

Track listing

Music video
The music video for "Ocean Breathes Salty" was directed by Chris Milk. The video shows a young boy finding a bird with a broken wing, which throughout the video becomes lead singer Isaac Brock. The boy patches up the bird and shows it to his mother, who is disgusted. She tries to take the bird away, and then the boy runs away and spends the night in a field with the bird where he dreams that he can play with it when it heals. When he wakes up, he finds that the bird has died, and he buries it. As he walks away, the band, all dressed up as animals, appear and finish the song, then disappear.

Charts

Cover
On the front cover of both releases of the single, one of the band's icons (an upside down hot air balloon with an anchor) can be seen.

Other recordings
San Francisco folk rock band Sun Kil Moon recorded a cover version of "Ocean Breathes Salty" on their 2005 album Tiny Cities.

Personnel
Isaac Brock - Vocals, guitar
Eric Judy - Bass
Dann Gallucci - Guitar, keyboards
Benjamin Weikel - Drums

References

2005 singles
Modest Mouse songs
Music videos directed by Chris Milk
2004 songs
Epic Records singles
Songs written by Dann Gallucci
Songs written by Eric Judy
Songs written by Isaac Brock (musician)